Things Are Getting Better is an album by vocalist Eddie Jefferson recorded in 1974 and released on the Muse label.

Reception

In his review for AllMusic, Scott Yanow stated: "Singer Eddie Jefferson's first album in five years finds him doing his best to keep up with the times. ... A worthy effort."

Track listing
All lyrics/vocalese composed by Eddie Jefferson
 "Bitches Brew" (Miles Davis) – 8:46
 "Things Are Getting Better" (Cannonball Adderley) – 8:24
 "Freedom Jazz Dance" (Eddie Harris) – 3:57
 "Night in Tunisia" (Dizzy Gillespie, Frank Paparelli) – 3:13
 "Trane's Blues" (John Coltrane) – 4:48
 "I Just Got Back in Town" (James Moody) – 4:29
 "Billie's Bounce" (Charlie Parker) – 4:07
 "Thank You (Falettinme Be Mice Elf Agin)" (Sly Stone) – 4:09

Personnel
Eddie Jefferson – vocals
Joe Newman – trumpet 
Billy Mitchell – tenor saxophone, flute, bass clarinet
Mickey Tucker – piano, electric piano, organ
Sam Jones – bass 
Eddie Gladden – drums

References

1974 albums
Eddie Jefferson albums
Muse Records albums
Albums produced by Don Schlitten